Old Monroe School House is located in the Monroe section of Hardyston Township, Sussex County, New Jersey, United States. The schoolhouse was built in 1819 and was added to the National Register of Historic Places on August 12, 1977.

The building is owned by the Hardyston Heritage Society and is open to the public as a period education museum. It is usually open to the public on the first Sunday of the months of June through September.

See also
National Register of Historic Places listings in Sussex County, New Jersey

References

External links
 Hardyston Heritage Society

Defunct schools in New Jersey
School buildings completed in 1819
School buildings on the National Register of Historic Places in New Jersey
Schools in Sussex County, New Jersey
National Register of Historic Places in Sussex County, New Jersey
Hardyston Township, New Jersey
Museums in Sussex County, New Jersey
Education museums in the United States
One-room schoolhouses in New Jersey
History museums in New Jersey
New Jersey Register of Historic Places